The 2008 IAAF World Race Walking Cup was held on 10 and 11 May 2008 in the streets of Cheboksary, Chuvashia, Russia.

Detailed reports on the event and an appraisal of the results was given for the IAAF.

Complete results were published.

Medallists

Results

Men's 20 km

Team (20 km Men)

Men's 50 km

Team (50 km Men)

Men's 10 km (Junior)

Team (10 km Men Junior)

Women's 20 km

Team (20km Women)

Women's 10 km Junior

Team (10km Women Junior)

Participation
The participation of 430 athletes (276 men/154 women) from 53 countries is reported.

 (1/-)
 (8/7)
 (2/-)
 (13/8)
 (-/2)
 (6/2)
 (-/1)
 (1/-)
 (10/4)
 (6/3)
 (1/-)
 (5/2)
 (10/4)
 (3/3)
 (3/-)
 (3/2)
 (5/-)
 (12/6)
 (8/4)
 (3/4)
 (4/1)
 (9/6)
 (5/-)
 (1/-)
 (4/3)
 (12/8)
 (5/4)
 (4/5)
 (7/4)
 (1/-)
 (13/7)
 (1/-)
 (2/-)
 (4/-)
 (1/-)
 (9/7)
 (10/2)
 (1/2)
 (-/6)
 (13/8)
 (4/-)
 (3/2)
 (1/-)
 (4/1)
 (13/7)
 (5/1)
 (3/2)
 (1/-)
 (1/-)
 (6/2)
 (13/7)
 (3/1)
 (13/8)

References

External links
Official site – IAAF.org
Results – IAAF.org

World Athletics Race Walking Team Championships
World Race Walking Cup
Race Walking
International athletics competitions hosted by Russia